The pre-Celtic period in the prehistory of Central Europe and Western Europe occurred before the expansion of the Celts or their culture in Iron Age Europe and Anatolia (9th to 6th centuries BC), but after the emergence of the Proto-Celtic language and cultures. The area involved is that of the maximum extent of the Celtic languages in about the mid 1st century BC. The extent to which Celtic language, culture and genetics coincided and interacted during this period remains very uncertain and controversial.

History
When the Celts were first recorded about 600 BC, they were already widespread across Iberia, Gaul, and Central Europe.  In Ireland, the Book of Invasions gives a legendary account of the arrival of incoming peoples.

Languages

Proto-Celtic is mainly dated to approximately 800 BC, coincident with the Hallstatt culture, while the earliest possible divergence of pre-proto-Celtic dialects from Proto-Indo-European is mainly dated to between 3000 BC and 2000 BC.

In continental Europe, pre-Celtic languages of the European Bronze Age may be taken to comprise two distinct groups.
 Non-Indo-European languages (i.e. pre-Indo-European languages); these include Aquitanian (precursor of the Basque), Rhaetic, Etruscan, Iberian, which may be related to Basque but is still unclassified, and Paleo-Sardinian (there is evidence suggesting that may have had connection to the reconstructed Proto-Basque and to the Iberian language). Some scholars group Etruscan, Rhaetic and Lemnian together in the hypothetical Tyrrhenian language family, which may have originated in the Aegean Sea or during the Neolithic north of the Alps. Conversely, the Lemnian language could have arrived in the Aegean Sea during the Late Bronze Age, when Mycenaean rulers recruited groups of mercenaries from Sicily, Sardinia and various parts of the Italian peninsula.
 Indo-European dialects, such as Illyrian, possibly Lusitanian, the Proto-Italo-Celtic dialects, Belgian and "Old European". However, Lusitanian and Belgian may turn out to be Celtic, while Old European may turn out to be either Celtic or non-Indo-European. The very existence of Indo-European in Western Europe before the arrival of the Celts is highly speculative.

It has been suggested that results of large-scale genetic surveys, undertaken since the late 20th century, show that the present-day speakers of pre-Indo-European languages may not solely represent relict populations. For instance, Basques show a dominance of the Y-DNA Haplogroup R1b, which a majority of scholars now propose spread through Europe relatively recently, from the Eurasian steppe and/or southwest Asia in the late Neolithic period or early Bronze Age (4,000 to 8,000 years ago). R1b replaced nearly all indigenous male lineages in Iberia from 4500 to 4000 BC. However, present-day Basques also harbor some very rare and archaic lineages, such as the Paleolithic mitochondrial DNA Haplogroup U8a, and autosomal genetic analysis (the whole genome, not just Y-DNA) has shown that a majority of their ancestry derives from Neolithic farmers and Mesolithic hunter-gatherers, pre-dating the arrival of speakers of Indo-European languages.

Archaeology

In the later Celtic areas there were many disparate archaeological cultures.

See also

Neolithic Europe
Old European culture
Bronze Age Europe
Old European hydronymy
Pre-Germanic
Vasconic substratum hypothesis
Atlantic (Semitic) languages
Pre-Roman peoples of the Iberian Peninsula
Prehistoric Britain
Bronze Age Britain
Prehistoric Ireland
Paleolithic continuity theory
Italo-Celtic
Goidelic substrate hypothesis
Magdalenian

References

Bibliography

Bronze Age Europe
Celtic history
Pre-Indo-Europeans
Linguistic strata